Black Girls CODE (BGC) is a not-for-profit organization that focuses on providing technology education for African-American girls. Kimberly Bryant, an electrical engineer who had worked in biotech for over 20 years, founded Black Girls Code in 2011 to rectify the underrepresentation of African-American girls and women in the technology industry. The organization offers programs in computer programming, coding, as well as website, robot, and mobile application-building, with the goal of providing African-American youth with the skills to occupy some of the 1.4 million computing job openings expected to be available in the U.S. in 2020.

Founding
Bryant was inspired to start BGC after her gamer daughter, Kai, attended a computing summer camp and was disappointed in the experience. Her daughter was one in a handful of girls who were at the camp and was the only African American girl present. She also noted that the boys at the camp were given much more attention from the counselors than the few girls there. In an interview with Ebony, Bryant stated, "I wanted to find a way to engage and interest my daughter in becoming a digital creative instead of just a consumer, and I did not find other programs that were targeted to girls like her from underrepresented communities."

In 2011, Bryant convinced her colleagues from Genentech to create a six-week coding curriculum for Girls of Color. Her first educational series started in the basement of a college prep institution, and attended by a dozen girls, including her daughter. In January 2012, a tech consultancy company called ThoughtWorks invested in Bryant's initiative, providing her access to space and resources, and allowing the organization to prosper into an internationally recognized non-profit. As of December 2019, BGC has a total of 15 chapters.

Organization
BGC has become a rapidly growing phenomenon, quickly expanding in the US and abroad. Headquartered in Oakland, California, the organization grew to 2,000 students by August 2013 within the seven established institutions operating in seven States across the US, as well as in Johannesburg, South Africa. BGC seeks to double their reach by adding chapters in the US and Africa over the next two years. BGC also hosts bilingual workshops in partnership with Latino Startup Alliance. BGC's ultimate goal is "to grow to train 1 million girls by 2040 and become the 'girl scouts' of technology."

BGC depends on a vast body of volunteers to design and conduct workshop classes. Professionals from the IT sector share their expertise with the young students, helping them get acquainted with the fundamentals of software design in languages such as Scratch or Ruby on Rails. After school activities are alternated with day-long workshops; an extended course is held during the summer.

BGC primarily relies on donations to fund its activities; 75% students are currently on scholarships.

The motto of the Black Girls CODE is: "Imagine. Build. Create. – Imagine a world where everyone is given the tools to succeed, and then help us build ways for everyone to access information and create a new age of women of color in technology".

Awards and grants
Black Girls CODE received a $50,000 grant from Microsoft's Azure development (AzureDev) community campaign in January 2014. Bryant also received a "Standing O-vation" presented by Oprah Winfrey and Toyota in November 2014.

In August 2015, Bryant turned down a grant of $125,000 from ride-sharing app Uber, calling the move disingenuous and "PR-driven". She also criticized Uber for offering Girls Who Code $1.2 million, an amount nearly ten times larger. We were not happy with some of the things that were occurring in the organization around the treatment of women as well as the treatment of underrepresented minorities... We also wanted to make sure that we were supported in a way that we felt we deserved. In February 2018 Black Girls CODE announced a partnership with Uber's competitor, Lyft, as part of their Round Up & Donate program.

See also
Girls Who Code
Native Girls Code
I Look Like an Engineer

References

External links

Educational charities based in the United States
Information technology charities
Youth charities
Organizations for women in science and technology
Computer science education
Women in computing
Charities based in California
501(c)(3) organizations
Shorty Award winners